Princess Christine Elisabeth of Schleswig-Holstein-Sonderburg (23 June 1638 – 7 June 1679), was a German noblewoman member of the House of Oldenburg and by marriage Duchess of Saxe-Weimar.

Born in Sonderburg, she was the second of the four children born from the marriage of John Christian, Duke of Schleswig-Holstein-Sonderburg, and Countess Anna of Oldenburg-Delmenhorst. From her three older and younger siblings, two survive adulthood: Dorothea Auguste (by marriage Landgravine of Hesse-Darmstadt) and Christian Adolph, Duke of Schleswig-Holstein-Sonderburg.

Life
In Weimar on 14 August 1656, Christine Elisabeth married John Ernest, Hereditary Prince of Saxe-Weimar. They had five children:
Anna Dorothea (Weimar, 12 November 1657 – Quedlinburg, 23 June 1704), Abbess of Quedlinburg (1685).
Wilhelmine Christine (Weimar, 26 January 1658 – Sondershausen, 30 June 1712), married on 25 September 1684 to Christian William I, Count of Schwarzburg-Sondershausen.
Eleonore Sophie (Weimar, 22 March 1660 – Lauchstädt, 4 February 1687), married on 9 July 1684 to Philipp, Duke of Saxe-Merseburg-Lauchstädt.
William Ernest, Duke of Saxe-Weimar (Weimar, 19 October 1662 – Weimar, 26 August 1728).
John Ernest III, Duke of Saxe-Weimar (Weimar, 22 June 1664 – Weimar, 10 May 1707).

After the death of her father-in-law (1662), she became Duchess of Saxe-Weimar.

She died in Weimar aged 40. She was buried in the Fürstengruft, Weimar.

References

|-

Christine Elisabeth
Christine Elisabeth
1638 births
1679 deaths